Kvaløya is the name of many islands in Norway:

Large islands
 Kvaløya (Tromsø), in Tromsø municipality, Troms county
 Kvaløya SK, the local sports club
 Kvaløya, Finnmark, in Hammerfest and Kvalsund municipalities, Finnmark county
 Kvaløya, Frøya, in Frøya municipality, Trøndelag county
 Kvaløya, Flatanger, in Flatanger municipality, Trøndelag county
 Kvaløya, Leka, in Leka municipality, Trøndelag county
 Kvaløya, Vikna, in Vikna municipality, Trøndelag county
 Kvaløya, Sømna, in Sømna municipality, Nordland county
 Kvaløya, Brønnøy, in Brønnøy municipality, Nordland county
 Kvaløya, Herøy, in Herøy municipality, Nordland county
 Nordkvaløya, in Karlsøy municipality, Troms county